According to the Book of Mormon Nephi, along with his brother Lehi, was a Nephite missionary. His father was Helaman, and his sons include two of the twelve Nephite disciples at the time that Christ visited the Americas.

Known genealogy

Early life
Nephi was the eldest son of Helaman, another Nephite prophet. Little is known about the activities of his early life, beyond his birth year of 54 BC. Except, he is said to have begun "to grow up unto the Lord" in the 48th year of the "reign of the judges", which likely corresponds to 44 BC. This year marked the a turning point in the affairs of the people, as two years of "much contention" "began to cease, in a small degree." In the 49th year of the reign of the judges (c. 43 BC), there was "continual peace established in the land" outside the activities of the Gadianton robbers. The church to which Nephi's father was a prophet saw "great prosperity" in the same year, with tens of thousands being baptized and united to "the Church of God." The next three years (50-52 ROJ, 42-40 BC) also passed in "continual peace and great joy", but the pride of the "hearts of the people who professed to belong to the church of God" began to grow due to their prosperity.

Tenure as Chief Judge
In this period of prosperity and pride within the Church, Helaman, died and Nephi began to govern in his stead. He is said to have followed in the footsteps of his father, that "he did fill the judgment-seat with justice and equity; yea, he did keep the commandments of God." 	

Despite his apparent honor in rule, there were contentions among the people and many dissented from the Nephite nation, eventually resulting in war between the Nephites and the Lamanites. By 59 ROJ (33 BC), the Lamanites were victorious in driving the Nephite armies, headed by Moronihah, entirely out of the land southward.

Post-judgeship preaching
In the same year, 'Nephi delivered up the judgment-seat to a man whose name was Cezoram,' being weary of the iniquity of the people, who consisted more of those choosing evil than those choosing good. He dedicated the remainder of his life to preaching the gospel along with his brother Lehi, being motivated by the preaching of their father that 'it is upon the rock of our Redeemer, who is Christ, the Son of God, that ye must build your foundation ... a foundation whereon if men build they cannot fall.' Their preaching started in the city of Bountiful and then proceeding to the cities of Gid and Mulek, and then to all of the Nephite cities in the land southward. From there, they went "into the land of Zarahemla, among the Lamanites." 	

These preachings are described as being with much power and authority, even to the point of having the words they should speak given them by revelation. Their preaching resulting in much success, first among those Nephites who had dissented and later among the Lamanites. The repentant Nephites were "confounded, ... [confessed] their sins and were baptized unto repentance, and immediately returned to the Nephites to endeavor to repair unto them the wrongs which they had done." The Lamanites were astonished and convinced, with 8,000 of them "in the land of Zarahemla and round about baptized unto repentance, and were convinced of the wickedness of the traditions of their fathers."

Prison in the Land of Nephi
After their great success in the land of Zarahemla, Nephi and Lehi proceeded to the land of Nephi where they were captured by an army of Lamanites and put in prison - the same prison in which Ammon and his brothers, previous Nephite missionaries, had been held - where they were denied food for "many days." At the time they were to be taken from prison and executed, however, they were protected by a 'pillar of fire' and the Lamanites were "struck dumb" with amazement and were afraid of being burned. Nephi and Lehi seized this opportunity to spread their missionary message, and told the people to "[f]ear not" and that the "marvelous thing" was of God. 	

After Nephi and Lehi tried to console the people, the "earth shook exceedingly" and the people were "overshadowed with a cloud of darkness" which caused an "awful solemn fear" to come upon them. This was followed by a "voice of perfect mildness" that is said to have pierced "even to the very soul" when it twice times urged the people to repent and not to "destroy my servants whom I have sent unto you to declare good tidings" and once spoke "marvelous words which cannot be uttered by man", interspersed with more earthquakes. 	

During these happenings, a man who was a Nephite by birth "who had once belonged to the church of God but had dissented" named Aminadab observed Nephi and Lehi apparently conversing with "the angels of God" and explained the phenomenon to the Lamanites, who were frozen with fear. Aminadab also explained that the cloud of darkness could be removed if they would "repent, and cry unto the voice, even until ye shall have faith in Christ." The people followed this instruction, and the cloud of darkness was dispersed. Not only that, but they also were encircled by fire, were filled with the 'Holy Spirit of God' and again they heard the voice, this time urging them to be at peace. Nephi and Lehi, who were among them, urged them to "go forth and marvel not, neither should they doubt." 	

Upon the preaching of these three hundred witnesses, the majority of the Lamanites "were convinced" and "did lay down their weapons of war, and also their hatred and the tradition of their fathers" and "did yield up unto the Nephites the lands of their possession."

Preaching in the North
By 63 RJ (29 BC), the Lamanites "had become, the more part of them, a righteous people, insomuch that their righteousness did exceed that of the Nephites, because of their firmness and their steadiness in the faith" and Nephi and Lehi went with many Lamanite missionaries into the land northward (also known as the land of Mulek) to preach. In 69 RJ (23 BC), however, Nephi was forced to return to the land of Zarahemla, as those in the land northward rejected "all his words."

Preaching in Zarahemla
Upon returning to the "land of his nativity", Nephi found the people in a state of "awful wickedness." The Gadianton robbers had usurped positions of power and the government had, therefore, become full of corruption.

Prophecy of murdered Chief Judge
Being filled with sorrow because of the wickedness of the people, Nephi 'bowed himself' and prayed upon a tower in his garden, which was by the highway leading to the 'chief market' in the city of Zarahemla. In the 'agony of his soul,' Nephi lamented the state of the people and wished that he could have lived during the time of Lehi, the forefather of his people. 	

Those passing by heard his prayer of anguish, and they ran and called others together to determine the cause of this great mourning. Upon seeing the gathering people, Nephi turned his attention from praying to preaching. He counseled the onlookers to repent and to overcome the attraction of pride and riches. He prophesied of the loss of their great cities if they did not repent and earn the protection of the Lord. He also explained that the Lamanites, who were traditionally more wicked, would enjoy a better fate in the afterlife, and live longer in the promised land because they had not "sinned against that great knowledge" that the Nephites had received - representing a principle of the accountability that comes with knowledge. Lastly, he testified that he knew what he had spoken was true "because the Lord God has made them known" unto him. 	

Upon hearing Nephi's words, there were some judges, who were members of the Gadianton robbers against whom Nephi taught, who roused others to opposition in an attempt to have Nephi arrested and tried. Others, however, were convinced of the truth of his words to the extent that those who were opposed feared to lay their hands on him. 	

Seeing that he had convinced at least some of the crown, Nephi continued his preaching. He began by addressing the skeptics in the group who did not believe in his status as a prophet of God by comparing himself to Moses using the example of the parting of the Red Sea. From there he transferred into a discussion of different prophecies that had been made concerning the coming of Christ, first by teaching of the parallels between the serpent staff Moses raised in the wilderness and then teaching of the Priesthood given to Abraham, which was after the order of Christ. He also mentioned prophecies by Zenos, Zenock, Ezias, Isaiah, and Jeremiah. Jeremiah he addressed specifically with respect to the prophecy of the destruction of Jerusalem, something the people knew of from the descendants of Mulek in their own land. Lastly, he taught of the people's ancestors, including Nephi and Lehi, as witnesses of the "coming of Christ." 	

Then, after reminding the people of their wickedness due to choosing riches and pride rather than following the counsel of these prophets, he testified that their destruction was "even at [their] doors" and reveals the secret murder of their Chief Judge by his brother - both of whom were Gadianton robbers. 	

Five members of the crowd ran to the judgment-seat to test Nephi's words. Upon arriving they found the Chief Judge murdered and they fell to the earth with fear, knowing that all of Nephi's prophecies would also be fulfilled. When others, ignorant of the happenings at Nephi's garden, came to the scene, having been notified by the servants of the Chief Judge, they assumed the five trembling men to be guilty and put them in jail. At the burial of the Chief Judge the next day, however, those present at Nephi's garden exonerated the five runners. Immediately after their release, the five men argued powerfully against the Gadianton robber judges, who blamed Nephi for the murder, due to his apparent foreknowledge of the event. Nephi was bound and brought before people, where he was questioned and bribed with money and the sparing of his life. He responded, however, after rebuking the people and again calling them to repentance, by showing them "another sign." He instructed them to go the house of Seantum, the brother of Seezoram the slain Chief Judge, and to question him in a particular way that would lead to his confession. The followed his counsel and received the confession as promised, freeing both Nephi and the five runners from blame. 	

The events left the people in a state of confusion. Some claimed Nephi to be a prophet and some even claimed him to be a god. Unable to agree, the people separated, leaving Nephi alone.

Famine rather than the sword
While on the way back to his home "being much cast down because of the wickedness of the people of the Nephites", Nephi heard a voice from heaven praising him. The voice promises that Nephi will receive whatever he asks because he only asks for that which is according to God's will and also gives him power that "whatsoever [he] shall seal on earth shall be sealed in heaven; and whatsoever [he] shall loose on earth shall be loosed in heaven." In conclusion, the voice commanded Nephi to call the people again to repentance upon threat of destruction. 	

After hearing the voice, Nephi turned immediately and began preaching to the scattered multitudes of the Nephites. Despite the fulfilled prophesy of the Chief Judge's murder, the people hardened their hearts - even to the point of attempting to throw Nephi in jail. He was protected by the "power of God", however, and continued preaching until the word had gone forth among all of the people. 	

By the end of the 71 ROJ (21 BC), a civil war had broken out among the people and it intensified over the next two years. Seeing that the people were destroying themselves by the sword, Nephi prayed that God would send a famine "to stir them up in remembrance of the Lord their God." The famine came in 73 ROJ (19 BC) and, as a result, the war ceased. For the next two years, the famine continued until the people "began to remember the Lord their God ... and the words of Nephi" and they pleaded with their leaders to ask Nephi to pray for rain. Seeing that the people had repented, Nephi obliged and in 76 ROJ (16 BC) the famine was lifted and the people rejoiced, praised God and they esteemed Nephi "as a great prophet, and a man of God, having great power and authority given unto him from God."

Later life
After the end of the famine, Nephi continue to lead the Church in the land, to which the majority of the people belonged by 77 ROJ (15 BC). After years of peace and prosperity, there arose some contention in 78 ROJ (13 BC) leading to 'much strife' in 79 ROJ (12 BC). Through their preaching, however, "Nephi and Lehi, and many of their brethren who knew concerning the true points of doctrine, having many revelations daily", were able to resolve the disputes.

Baptisms
In 87 ROJ (5 BC), after years of wickedness and the rise to power again of the Gadianton robbers, Samuel the Lamanite prophesied to the Nephites concerning the coming of Christ. Those whom he converted in the city of Zarahemla went to Nephi, who was "baptizing, and prophesying, and preaching, crying repentance unto the people, showing signs and wonders, working miracles among the people, that they might know that the Christ must shortly come", to be baptized.

Disappearance
In 91 ROJ (1 BC), Nephi turned "the plates of brass, and all the records which had been kept, and all those things which had been kept sacred from the departure of Lehi out of Jerusalem" over to his eldest son, also named Nephi. He then "departed out of the land, and whither he went, no man knoweth."

See also

Book of Helaman
Aminadab

Notes and references

External links
 Book of Mormon Index entry on Nephi, son of Helaman

Book of Mormon prophets
Angelic visionaries